Gustav Gihr (18 August 1894 – 31 October 1959) was a German general in the Wehrmacht of Nazi Germany during World War II. He commanded several infantry divisions during the war before surrendering to the Red Army in 1944.

Biography
On 15 May 1944 Gihr became commander of the 707th Infantry Division and fought during the Bobruisk Offensive on the Eastern Front. On 27 June 1944, at Bobruisk, Gihr was taken prisoner by the Red Army. He was released from captivity on 11 October 1955.

Notes

References
 

1894 births
1959 deaths
People from Tuttlingen (district)
People from the Grand Duchy of Baden
Major generals of the German Army (Wehrmacht)
German Army personnel of World War I
German prisoners of war in World War II held by the Soviet Union
Recipients of the Gold German Cross
Military personnel from Baden-Württemberg
German Army generals of World War II